A production brigade was formerly the basic accounting and farm production unit in the people's commune system of the People's Republic of China.

See also
Work unit
Administrative divisions of the People's Republic of China

References

 

Cold War history of China
Society of China
Economic history of the People's Republic of China